The 1928 Pottsville Maroons season was their fourth in the league and their last before changing their name to the Boston Bulldogs. The team failed to improve on their previous league output of 5–8, winning only two games. They finished eighth in the league.

Schedule

Standings

References

1928
Pottsville Maroons
Boston